Bathyarca lucida is a species of marine mollusk in the family Arcidae.

Original description
Poppe G.T., Tagaro S.P. & Goto Y. (2018). New marine species from the Central Philippines. Visaya. 5(1): 91-135. page(s): 115, pl. 15 figs 1-3.

References

Arcidae